Nidfurn is a village, and former municipality, in the municipality of Glarus Süd and canton of Glarus in Switzerland.

History 
Nidfurn is first mentioned in 1289 as Nitfúre.

Nidfurn belonged to Säckingen Abbey until 1395. During the middle ages, it was one of the richest parts of Glarus. Until the 20th century, the principal economic activity in the village was the raising of cattle, sheep and goats, with the dairy industry developing in the 18th century. Cotton spinning by hand was also common in the 18th century, but this never developed into factory-based industrial activity.

In 1879, Linthal was connected to the Swiss railway network by the opening of the Swiss Northeastern Railway line from Weesen to Linthal.

On 1 July 2006, the municipality of Nidfurn was merged into the municipality of Haslen. On 1 January 2011, the municipality of Haslen was itself merged into the new municipality of Glarus Süd.

Geography
Leuggelbach lies to the south, Schwanden is to the north, and Haslen is across the river to the east.

Transport 
Nidfurn is located on the Hauptstrasse 17, which runs the length of the canton of Glarus before climbing the Klausen Pass into the canton of Uri, as well as on the Weesen to Linthal railway line that parallels the main road and the Linth river through Glarus. The high alpine Klausen Pass is normally only open to traffic between June and September, and for the rest of the year the road and railway up the valley form the only access to the village. The village is served by Nidfurn-Haslen railway station, which is served by the hourly Zürich S-Bahn service S25 between Linthal and Zurich.

Demographics
The historical population of Nidfurn is given in the following table:

References

External links
 
 Nidfurn from the Glarus Süd municipal web site (in German) 
 

Former municipalities of the canton of Glarus
Villages in the canton of Glarus